The 64th (2nd Highland) Division was an infantry division of the British Army, raised during the Great War. The division was formed in late 1914 as a second-line Territorial Force formation which served on home defence duties throughout the war.

The division was formed as a duplicate of the 51st (Highland) Division in 1914, composed primarily of soldiers from Highland regiments recruited in northern and central Scotland. By 1917-18, however, it had become a training unit composed of conscripts from throughout Britain. It remained on home defence and training duties in Scotland and England throughout the war, and disbanded in early 1919 following the Armistice of 11 November 1918.

History
The division was created as the "2nd Highland Division", a second-line formation of the Highland Division at the end of August 1914. At this time, Territorial Force soldiers could not be deployed overseas without their consent and the Territorial units were accordingly split into a "first line", with men who had volunteered for overseas service, and a "second line", which was intended for home service only. The second line units also served to absorb the large number of new, untrained, recruits who had joined the Territorial Force following the outbreak of war. The division's units formed through late 1914 and assembled as a coherent unit in January 1915.

As with the original Highland Division, the 2nd Highland was organised into three infantry brigades. These were later numbered as the 191st, composed of the 2/4th, 2/5th, and 2/6th Seaforth Highlanders, 2/4th Cameron Highlanders, and 2/4th Black Watch; the 192nd, composed of the 2/4th, 2/5th, 2/6th, and 2/7th Gordon Highlanders and 2/6th and 2/7th Black Watch; and the 193rd, composed of the 2/6th, 2/7th, 2/8th, and 2/9th Argyll and Sutherland Highlanders. With fifteen battalions, the 2nd Highland had a higher nominal strength than its parent division; the three additional units came from the second-line units of the Black Watch Brigade, assigned to the division as it assembled in January 1915.

The 191st Brigade recruited from the far north of Scotland; the 192nd from the north-east and Aberdeen; and the 193rd from central and western Scotland. The Black Watch battalions were recruited from Fife, Dundee and Perthshire. The division also raised second-line Territorial artillery, medical, signal and engineer units, from the same areas.

Through the next two years, the 2nd Highland, numbered as the 64th Division in 1915, provided trained men for its parent unit as well as carrying out home defence duties. The division was assembled in Fife and Perthshire. In mid-1915 the strength of its infantry battalions was set at a minimum 600 men, with any more than this being transferred overseas; later that year, all the infantry battalions were renumbered and several were amalgamated. The old unit numbering was reinstated in January 1916 but the amalgamations remained.

In 1916 the division howitzer brigade was broken up and its heavy artillery battery sent to France; a third field artillery brigade was briefly added but dissolved soon afterwards. In March 1916 the division was transferred to England, where it was stationed in East Anglia as part of Northern Army.

A second wave of reorganisation took place in 1917–18, with the division absorbing twelve "graduated battalions" – training units – and disbanding almost all of its original infantry units. By the time of the Armistice in November 1918, its infantry complement consisted entirely of graduated battalions. The division was demobilised shortly afterwards and ceased to exist in April 1919.

The division was not reformed during the Second World War, and the numbers for the subsidiary brigades were also not reused.

Order of battle
The order of battle was as follows (organisation details are taken from The British Army in the Great War unless otherwise noted):

General Officer Commanding
General Officers Commanding included:
Major-General Richard Bannatine-Allason c.March 1916 - c.August 1917
Major-General Herman Landon August 1917 - April 1918
Major-General Henry Lukin April 1918 - November 1918
Major-General John Capper November 1918 - May 1919

See also

 List of British divisions in World War I

References

Infantry divisions of the British Army in World War I
Military units and formations established in 1914
Military units and formations of Scotland
Military units and formations disestablished in 1919